Ruslan Aleksandrovich Kambolov (born 1 January 1990) is a Russian footballer who plays as a centre-back or defensive midfielder for Aktobe in the Kazakhstan Premier League.

Club career
On 1 February 2014, he signed with FC Rubin Kazan.

On 10 June 2019, he signed a 2-year contract with FC Krasnodar.

On 7 September 2021, he joined Arsenal Tula. On 14 January 2022, his contract with Arsenal was terminated by mutual consent.

On 5 March 2022, Kambolov signed with FC Aktobe in Kazakhstan.

International
Kambolov made his debut for the Russia national football team on 31 March 2015 in a friendly game against Kazakhstan.

On 11 May 2018, he was included in Russia's extended 2018 FIFA World Cup squad. Due to injury, he was replaced by Sergei Ignashevich on 14 May.

Career statistics

References

External links
 
 
 

1990 births
Sportspeople from Vladikavkaz
Russian people of Ossetian descent
Living people
Russian footballers
Russia youth international footballers
Russia under-21 international footballers
Russia international footballers
Association football defenders
FC Lokomotiv Moscow players
FC Nizhny Novgorod (2007) players
FC Volgar Astrakhan players
FC Neftekhimik Nizhnekamsk players
FC Rubin Kazan players
FC Krasnodar players
FC Krasnodar-2 players
FC Arsenal Tula players
FC Aktobe players
Russian Premier League players
Russian First League players
Kazakhstan Premier League players
2017 FIFA Confederations Cup players
Russian expatriate footballers
Expatriate footballers in Kazakhstan
Russian expatriate sportspeople in Kazakhstan